Oregon Highway 23 may refer to:
For the former OR 23, see Oregon Route 23.
For the unsigned Highway 23, see Dairy-Bonanza Highway.
For the former unsigned Highway 23, see Klamath-Crater Lake Highway.